Borucki (Polish feminine: Borucka; plural: Boruccy) is a surname. Notable people with the surname include:

 Anna Borucka-Cieślewicz (born 1941), Polish politician
 Percy Borucki (born 1929), German fencer
 Ryan Borucki (born 1994), American baseball player
 William J. Borucki (born 1939), American space scientist

See also
 

Polish-language surnames